Newton Township is a township in Harvey County, Kansas, United States.  As of the 2000 census, its population was 1,950.

Geography
According to the USGS, it contains two cemeteries: Greenwood and Saint Marys.

Transportation
Newton Township contains one airport, the Newton City-County Airport is located three miles east of the city of Newton.

References

Further reading

External links
 Harvey County Website
 City-Data.com
 Harvey County Maps: Current, Historic, KDOT

Townships in Harvey County, Kansas
Townships in Kansas